Kevin Stevens (born 17 May 1953) is an Australian former rugby league footballer who played in the 1970s and 1980s.

Playing career
Stevens made his first grade debut for Easts in 1974, and was a member of the 1975 premiership-winning side, where Easts thrashed St George 38–0.  Stevens' later career was threatened by a series of knee injuries, forcing him to play as a prop in reserve grade in 1980 when Jack Gibson's decision to bring him to Parramatta drew much criticism. After missing the semi-finals with an elbow injury, Stevens was a valuable member of Parramatta's maiden grand final victory over Newtown in 1981.

References

1953 births
Living people
Australian rugby league players
Parramatta Eels players
Rugby league locks
Rugby league players from Grafton, New South Wales
Sydney Roosters players